Juan Enrique García Rivas (born April 16, 1970) is a Venezuelan football striker. He is the all-time leading goalscorer in the Venezuelan Primera División, and has been league top scorer in five different seasons (also a record).

Club career
García played for a number of different clubs in Venezuela. He started his career with Minervén in 1988. In 1996, he joined Caracas FC where he was part of the championship winning squad. The following season, he joined Zulia where he won another league championship.

In 1999, he returned to Caracas FC where he became the top scorer in Venezuelan football for the first time. In the 2001–02 season he won another league title with Deportivo Táchira and claimed his second topscorer award. He was topscorer again in the following two seasons with Monagas and Mineros.

For the 2005–06 season, he returned to Deportivo Táchira where he became topscorer for the fifth time.

In 2007, he had a brief spell with Deportivo Pasto of Colombia

International career
García played 49 times for the Venezuela national team between 1993 and 2009, scoring 7 goals. He was included in three Copa América squads in 1993, 1995 and 1999. He also played in World Cup Qualifiers for the 1994, 1998, 2002, 2006 and 2010 World Cups.

Honours

Club
Caracas FC
Venezuelan Primera División: 1996–97

Zulia
 Venezuelan Primera División: 1997–98

Deportivo Táchira
 Venezuelan Primera División: 2001–02

Individual
 Venezuelan Primera División topscorer: 1999–2000 (24 goals), 2001–02 (34 goals), 2002–03 (39 goals), 2003–04 (18 goals), 2005–06 (21 goals)

References

External links
 International career statistics at rsssf
 

1970 births
Living people
People from Bolívar (state)
Venezuelan footballers
Association football forwards
Venezuela international footballers
1991 Copa América players
1993 Copa América players
1995 Copa América players
1999 Copa América players
Venezuelan Primera División players
Categoría Primera A players
Minervén S.C. players
Caracas FC players
Zulia F.C. players
Deportivo Italia players
Deportivo Táchira F.C. players
Monagas S.C. players
A.C.C.D. Mineros de Guayana players
Deportivo Pasto footballers
Zamora FC players
Estudiantes de Mérida players
Deportivo La Guaira players
Venezuelan expatriate footballers
Expatriate footballers in Colombia
Venezuelan expatriate sportspeople in Colombia